Colton is a village in the Selby District of North Yorkshire, England, seven miles south-west of York.  The closest town is Tadcaster.

History
In 1392, William son of William de Colton was pardoned on grounds of self-defense for killing Robert Mason in Colton.

Amenities
The village has one pub, Ye Olde Sun Inn.  There is a wider selection of amenities in neighbouring Copmanthorpe.  For amenities such as supermarkets it is necessary to travel to either Tadcaster or York.

Transport
The village is close to the A64 and the East Coast Main Line.  Upon completion of High Speed 2 this will join the East Coast Main Line at Colton.  Despite being situated on the East Coast Main Line, the closest railway station is Ulleskelf, several miles away.

References

Villages in North Yorkshire